"Where You Are" is a song by the South Korean rock band CN Blue, written by Jung Yong-hwa and Kenji Tamai. It is the second major single by the band in Japan under Warner Music Japan and their fifth overall. It was released on February 1, 2012 in 3 different editions: CD+DVD, Regular edition and Lawson store limited edition.

Composition
"Where You Are" was composed and written by Jung Yong-hwa and Kenji Tamai. The B-side, "Get Away" was written by Nozomi Maezawa and Agehasprings and composed by Lee Jong-hyun and Ryo. The second B-side, "Feeling" was written and composed by Jung Yong-hwa and Ryo.

Promotions
To promote the single, the band performed the song on the music TV shows Music Japan on January 29 and on Hey! Hey! Hey! Music Champ on January 30. B-side of the Single "Get Away" was chosen as ending theme song for Japanese broadcast of American TV Series Gossip Girl Season 3 started from May 1.

Music video
A TV advertisement for the single was released on December 27, 2011. The full music video was released on January 8, 2012 on the music TV network Space Shower TV. In the music video, the members are playing the song in front of various mirrors. Warner Music Japan uploaded the music video to YouTube on January 29.

Track listing

Chart performance
The physical single debuted at number one in Oricon's Daily chart with 32,943 copies sold on the first day and on the Weekly chart with 60,398 copies sold in the first week. The single is the first #1 single of the group on the country and first for a foreign band since 1971, when the Canadian band Mashmakhan released the single "Two in the Fog". The band is the fourth South Korean male artist/group to rank number 1 in Oricon's Weekly singles chart, along with Tohoshinki, JYJ members Jaejoong & Yoochun and Jang Keun-suk.

Charts

Oricon

Other charts

Release history

References

External links
 

2012 singles
Japanese-language songs
Oricon Weekly number-one singles
CNBLUE songs
Songs written by Jung Yong-hwa
Warner Music Japan singles
2011 songs